Einar Hansen (11 July 1892 – 30 August 1951) was a Norwegian footballer. He played in six matches for the Norway national football team from 1912 to 1916.

References

External links
 

1892 births
1951 deaths
Norwegian footballers
Norway international footballers
Place of birth missing
Association footballers not categorized by position